Yannick Imbs (born 5 July 1985) is a French footballer who plays as a forward for Kehler FV.

References

External links
 Profile on racingstub.com
 Profile on FuPa.net

1985 births
Living people
Footballers from Strasbourg
French footballers
French expatriate footballers
French expatriate sportspeople in Italy
Expatriate footballers in Italy
French expatriate sportspeople in Germany
Expatriate footballers in Germany
Association football forwards
RC Strasbourg Alsace players
S.P.A.L. players
SV Sandhausen players
SC Schiltigheim players
3. Liga players